is a junction passenger railway station located in the city of Sanda, Hyōgo Prefecture, Japan. It is jointly operated by the West Japan Railway Company (JR West) and the private transportation company, Kobe Electric Railway (Shintetsu).

Lines

Station layout

JR West
There are 2 side platforms with a track each on the ground.  Ticket machines and ticket gates are in the building over the platforms and tracks.The station has a Midori no Madoguchi staffed ticket office.

Shintetsu
There are two bay platforms platforms with two tracks on the ground.

History
Sanda Sation opened on 25 January 1899, as a station of Hankaku Railway, which was nationalized in 1907. With the privatization of the Japan National Railways (JNR) on 1 April 1987, the station came under the aegis of the West Japan Railway Company.

Station numbering was introduced to the JR West facilities in March 2018 with the platforms being assigned station number JR-G61.

Passenger statistics
In fiscal 2016, the JR portion of the station was used by an average of 18,434 passengers daily and Shintetsu portion of the station was used by 8,386 passengers daily in the same period.

Surrounding area
 Sanda City Hall
 Hyogo Prefectural Arima High School

See also
List of railway stations in Japan

References

External links 

 Sanda Station from JR-Odekake.net 
 Sanda Station from Shintetsu home page 

Railway stations in Hyōgo Prefecture
Railway stations in Japan opened in 1899
Sanda, Hyōgo